Fremont is a Bay Area Rapid Transit (BART) station in the central district of Fremont, California. The station is served by the Orange Line and Green Line. It was the southern terminus of both lines from September 11, 1972 until March 25, 2017, when Warm Springs/South Fremont station opened.

History

Service at the station began on September 11, 1972. During the first months of revenue service, the Automatic Train Control (ATC) system had safety problems with its design and operation. On October 2, 1972, an ATC failure caused a train to run off the end of the elevated track at the Fremont station and crash to the ground - an incident dubbed the "Fremont Flyer". Four people on board were injured. The incident drew national and international attention, followed a month later by release of the "Post Report" on BART safety by the legislative analyst for the California State Senate. The "Fremont Flyer" train crash led to a comprehensive redesign of the automatic train control system, the firing of the general manager, and the replacement of the board of directors.

Fremont was the southern terminus of East Bay service from the system's opening in 1972 until March 25, 2017, when the line was extended to Warm Springs/South Fremont station.

Transit connections

A three-lane bus plaza on the east side of Fremont station is a transfer hub for AC Transit buses:
Local routes: 99, 200, 212, 216, 217, 232, 239, 251
Early Bird Express: 707
All Nighter: 801
Two Stanford Marguerite Shuttle routes, AE-F and East Bay Express, also terminate at Fremont.

The station was the northern terminus of Santa Clara Valley Transportation Authority (VTA) bus service from June 25, 1973 to December 28, 2019. VTA discontinued service to Fremont station as part of a systemwide network modification, which was originally intended be simultaneous with the opening of the BART extension to Berryessa. However, the BART extension did not open until June 13, 2020, leaving Warm Springs/South Fremont as the only connecting point between the two systems until that time.

References

External links 

BART - Fremont
Station on Google Maps Street View

Bay Area Rapid Transit stations in Alameda County, California
Stations on the Orange Line (BART)
Stations on the Green Line (BART)
Buildings and structures in Fremont, California
Railway stations in the United States opened in 1972
Bus stations in Alameda County, California
1972 establishments in California